Leaton railway station was a minor station located about six miles north of Shrewsbury on the GWR's Paddington to Birkenhead main line. Today this is part of the Shrewsbury to Chester line. It was at the top of the long climb up Hencote bank out of Shrewsbury. The station opened on 12 October 1848 and closed on 12 September 1960. The station building (now a private house) can still be seen on the north side of the adjacent Leaton level crossing on the east side of the line. A small industrial estate now exists at the former railway sidings.

Historical services
Express trains did not call at Leaton, only local services. It closed to passenger traffic in 1960.

According to the Official Handbook of Stations the following classes of traffic were being handled at this station in 1956: G, P & L, and there was no crane.

References

Neighbouring stations

Further reading

External links
 Leaton station on navigable 1946 O.S. map

Disused railway stations in Shropshire
Former Great Western Railway stations
Railway stations in Great Britain opened in 1848
Railway stations in Great Britain closed in 1960